Actinocrispum wychmicini is a bacterium from the genus Actinocrispum which has been isolated from soil from Kuroishi, Japan.

References

Pseudonocardiales
Bacteria described in 2016
Monotypic bacteria genera